This is a list of the seasons of the defunct Quebec Nordiques NHL/WHA professional ice hockey club.

Season-by-season record
''Note: GP = Games played, W = Wins, L = Losses, T = Ties, Pts = Points, GF = Goals scored for, GA = Goals scored against, PIM = Penalty minutes

WHA era

NHL era

1Season was shortened due to the 1994–95 NHL lockout.

 
Sea
Quebec Nordiques